Manohar Tirkey (born 20 November 1953) is an Indian politician and a member of the 15th Lok Sabha. He was elected on a Revolutionary Socialist Party  ticket from Alipurduars (Lok Sabha constituency).

The son of the late Leba Tirkey and late Sundhari Tirkey, he was born at Satali Tea Garden in Jalpaiguri district on 20 November 1953. He was educated at St. Joseph’s High School, Alipurduars. While in school he was the best player in the B.C.Roy Trophy.

An active trade unionist, he is General Secretary of Dooars Cha Bagan Workers’ Union and North Bengal Forest Majdur Union (both affiliated to UTUC) and is a member of the state committee of UTUC and RSP. As a member of the Lok Sabha, he is member of the  Committee on Social Justice and Empowerment and Committee on Government Assurances.

Earlier, he was elected to the West Bengal state assembly from Kalchini (Vidhan Sabha constituency) in 2006, 1996, 1991, 1982 and 1977. He was minister of state for PWD in 1996–2001 and in the Left Front Ministry in West Bengal in 2006.

References

Living people
Revolutionary Socialist Party (India) politicians
India MPs 2009–2014
People from Jalpaiguri district
1953 births
Lok Sabha members from West Bengal
State cabinet ministers of West Bengal
Revolutionary Socialist Party candidates in the 2014 Indian general election
People from Alipurduar
West Bengal MLAs 1977–1982
West Bengal MLAs 1982–1987
West Bengal MLAs 1991–1996
West Bengal MLAs 1996–2001
West Bengal MLAs 2001–2006
West Bengal MLAs 2006–2011